Sacred concerto (plural) is a 17th-century genre of sacred music, characterized as settings of religious texts requiring both vocal soloists and obbligato instrumental forces for performance. Starting from Italian models, the genre flourished primarily in Germany. It is a broad term for various genres of chamber concerto for a small number of voices and instruments popular in Germany during the 17th century and prefiguring the late baroque church cantata and solo sacred cantata forms.

History

Early Baroque
The stylistic roots of the concert lie in early baroque Italian models brought back to German by musicians such as Heinrich Schütz, and popularised by his contemporaries such as Samuel Scheidt. Some of these concerts take an Italianate dialogue or oratorio form, notably the works of Kaspar Förster and the dialogues of Schütz.

Middle Baroque
The next generation of composers working in this form include Johann Schelle, Johann Philipp Förtsch, Sebastian Knüpfer, Dietrich Buxtehude and early members of the Bach family, the works of whom have been partially preserved in the Altbachisches Archiv. Johann Pachelbel is another composer contributing to the genre, for instance his Christ lag in Todesbanden, P 60, for SATB voices, strings, bassoon and continuo.

Musical form and examples

Reception
Sacred Concerto - A piece of sacred music composed on a text that may be liturgical or non-liturgical (e. g., from the Psalms), which was sung after the Communion Hymn during the communion of the clergy at the Divine Liturgy. Sometimes hymns from other services, e. g., the All-Night Vigil, are sung as Sacred Concertos.  German church music of the Baroque era composed after the first half of 17th century was throughout the 20th century hardly ever indicated as sacred concerto or, in German, . Pieces of this genre were mostly qualified as motets or as cantatas, for instance:
Georg Christoph Bach's , ABA II, 2, was included in the second volume, titled  (Cantatas).

In 21st-century scholarship, the sacred concerto or  description is used more often to indicate compositions from the late 17th or early 18th century:

References

Sources
 
 
 
 

Cantatas
Classical music styles